Miřetice (1939–1945: Mirschetitz) is a municipality and village in Chrudim District in the Pardubice Region of the Czech Republic. It has about 1,300 inhabitants.

Administrative parts
Villages of Bošov, Čekov, Dachov, Dubová, Havlovice, Krupín and Švihov are administrative parts of Miřetice.

Sights
The area of former village Ležáky, destroyed during World War II, is part of Miřetice-Dachov. The events are commemorated in the Museum of Ležáky.

References

External links

 

Villages in Chrudim District